Kryptopterus vitreolus, known in the aquarium trade traditionally as the glass catfish and also as the ghost catfish or phantom catfish, is a small species of Asian glass catfish. It is commonly seen in the freshwater aquarium trade, but its taxonomy is confusing and was only fully resolved in 2013. It is endemic to Thailand, and found in rivers south of the Isthmus of Kra that drain into the Gulf of Thailand and river basins in the Cardamom Mountains.  There are also unconfirmed reports from Penang in Malaysia.

Until 1989, it was considered to be the same as the "glass catfish" Kryptopterus bicirrhis, a larger species infrequently seen in the aquarium trade. Subsequently, the ghost catfish commonly seen in the aquarium trade was believed to be the same as K. minor, but in 2013 it was established that the aquarium specimens actually represented another species, which was described as K. vitreolus. The true K. minor, which is restricted to Borneo, has rarely (if ever) entered the aquarium trade.

Description
This is a transparent freshwater catfish with two long barbels. They are transparent because, like all catfish, they are scaleless, and catfish within the genus Kryptopterus lack body pigment. Most of their organs are located near the head; with a magnifying glass, their heart can be seen beating. When the light strikes the fish just right, it can create an iridescent rainbow color. During strong illness and after death, they turn milky white. The scientific species name vitreolus is derived from the Latin vitreus, which means glass. Among described species of Kryptopterus, only two other species, K. minor and K. piperatus, have clearly transparent bodies and both these are largely – if not entirely – absent from the aquarium trade. The body of others, including K. bicirrhis, are only somewhat translucent or opaque.

In captivity

Native to rivers in Thailand, ghost catfish prefer tanks with open swimming areas with a moderate current and planted areas that provide shelter. Due to their timid and non-aggressive nature, they should always be kept in a group of at least five; they can be kept with other fish species of similar size and temperament.

Ghost catfish are highly sensitive to changes in water quality and pH. They have a reputation for being finicky eaters; they prefer live food such as mosquito (Culicidae) larvae, bloodworms (Chironomidae larvae) and brine shrimp (Artemia), but can be weaned to flake food with time.

Kryptopterus species are different from most other catfish because they are free-swimming and live in the mid to upper region of the water. Ghost catfish commonly favor dark places to being out in the open light. A small school of them may hide under elevated rocks, logs, or the shadow of plants. Sometimes, however, one or two may venture out into the open and swim in the upper level of the water. They can be enticed to do this more often if the flow of water in the tank is arranged so that their favorite hiding spots are sheltered, while a gentle current flows in the open areas. Thus, they will move in the open especially at feeding time, as they like to go after food drifting in the current. A generous growth of aquatic plants is necessary for their well-being, and floating plants can filter bright light, which they seem to find unpleasant.

Breeding has reputedly been achieved in aquariums, but is not documented. The aquarium trade in K. vitreolus generally relies on wild-caught specimens, and there are concerns that this may be unsustainable due to the volume and its limited range. Unlike many other aquarium fish, it is not known to be bred at commercial facilities.

Electromagnetic response 

K. vitreolus reacts to electromagnetic fields owing to a protein encoded by Electromagnetic Perceptive Gene (EPG).

See also

List of freshwater aquarium fish species

References

Siluridae
Fish of Thailand
Fish described in 2013
Taxa named by Maurice Kottelat